The following is a list of notable deaths in October 2012.

Entries for each day are listed alphabetically by surname. A typical entry lists information in the following sequence:
Name, age, country of citizenship and reason for notability, established cause of death, reference.

October 2012

1
Gordon Audley, 84, Canadian speed skater.
Dirk Bach, 51, German actor, comedian and television presenter, heart failure.
Donald E. Bently, 87, American entrepreneur and engineer.
Berkant, 73, Turkish singer, cancer.
Walter G. Church, Sr., 85, American politician, member of the North Carolina House of Representatives (1992–2008), acute myeloid leukemia.
Madhav Dalvi, 87, Indian cricketer.
Sahara Davenport, 27, American drag queen, reality show contestant (RuPaul's Drag Race) and singer, heart failure.
Abdelkader Fréha, 69, Algerian footballer (MC Oran).
Octavio Getino, 77, Spanish-born Argentine film director, cancer.
Hassan Ghul, Pakistani al-Qaeda member, drone strike.
Eric Hobsbawm, 95, British historian.
Russell Jones, 86, Australian Olympic (1960) ice hockey player.
Kwan Shan, 79, Chinese-born Hong Kong film actor, lung cancer.
Chronox Manek, Papua New Guinean lawyer and Chief Ombudsman (2008–2012).
Ali Hussein Nassif, Lebanese militant, member of Hezbollah, killed.
Armand Russell, 91, Canadian politician, MNA for Shefford (1956–1973) and Brome-Missisquoi (1976–1980); Minister of Public Works (1967–1970).
Moshe Sanbar, 86, Hungarian-born Israeli economist, Governor of the Bank of Israel (1971–1976).
Heinrich Schultz, 88, Estonian cultural functionary.
Neville Thiele, 91, Australian audio engineer.
Shlomo Venezia, 88, Greek-born Italian writer and Holocaust survivor.

2
Afrasheem Ali, Maldivian politician, stabbed.
John W. Gallivan, 97, American newspaper publisher, cable television pioneer, and civic leader.
Nicholas C. Handy, 71, British chemist, pancreatic cancer.
Konrad B. Knutsen, 87, Norwegian civil servant, State Conciliator of Norway (1975–1981).
Marjorie Lane, 100, American singer.
David N. Martin, 82, American advertising executive, founder of The Martin Agency, creator of the Virginia is for Lovers slogan, cancer.
Mohammed Mushaima, 24, Bahraini political activist, sickle cell anemia.
Kalambadi Muhammad Musliyar, 78, Indian Muslim scholar.
*Nguyễn Chí Thiện, 73, Vietnamese poet and activist, pneumonia.
Hideji Ōtaki, 87, Japanese actor, lung cancer.
Charles Roach, 79, Trinidadian-born Canadian civil rights lawyer, brain cancer.
J. Philippe Rushton, 68, Canadian psychology academic and intelligence theorist, cancer.
Erwin Steinberg, 91, American academic.
Big Jim Sullivan, 71, British guitarist, complications of heart disease and diabetes.

3
Mohammad Ali, 70, Bangladeshi physician and politician.
Abdul Haq Ansari, 81, Indian Islamic scholar, cardiac arrest.
Basilios Blatsos, 89, Greek-born Israeli Orthodox hierarch, Metropolitan of Caesarea (since 1975).
Bob Brooks, 84, American film director and advertising creative. (death announced on this day)
Warren Canning, 85, Australian football player.
Robert F. Christy, 96, American theoretical physicist and astrophysicist, member of the Manhattan Project.
Billy Hullin, 70, Welsh rugby union player.
Jean-Louis Lagadec, 79, French footballer (Le Havre AC, SC Bastia) and coach (FC Chalon). (French)
Kathi McDonald, 64, American singer.
Boo Morcom, 91, American Olympic athlete.
Alfonso Orueta, 82, Chilean politician and football manager.
Albie Roles, 91, English footballer.
Kidar Nath Sahani, 86, Indian politician, Governor of Sikkim (2001–2002) and Goa (2002–2004).
Peter J. Schmitt, 62, American politician, member of the Nassau County, New York, legislature (since 1996), heart attack.
Jörg Wischmeyer, 77, German Olympic athlete.

4
David Atkinson, 90, Canadian opera singer.
Günter Böttcher, 58, German Olympic handball player, injuries sustained in traffic collision.
Razia Butt, 88, Pakistani novelist.
Jim Galley, 68, English cricket player (Somerset).
K. C. N. Gowda, 84, Indian film producer and distributor, after short illness.
Bernard Holden, 104, British railway preservationist (Bluebell Railway).
Stan Mudenge, 70, Zimbabwean politician, Minister of Foreign Affairs (1995–2005), Minister of Higher and Tertiary Education (since 2005).
Helen Elizabeth Nash, 91, American pediatrician.
Rudolf Oslansky, 81, Austrian footballer (Wiener Sport-Club).
Zwelakhe Sisulu, 61, South African newspaper editor and journalist.
Daphne Slater, 84, English actress.
Tom Stannage, 68, Australian historian, cardiac arrest.
Gloria Taylor, 64, Canadian right to die activist, infection from a perforated colon.
Pramote Teerawiwatana, 45, Thai badminton player, lung cancer.
Erhard Wunderlich, 55, German Olympic silver medal-winning (1984) handball player, cancer.

5
Keith Campbell, 58, Scottish biologist, participant in the cloning of Dolly the Sheep, asphyxiation.
Pierre Chaulet, 82, Algerian doctor, stomach cancer.
Jack Clark, 88, Australian footballer.
Joyce Currie, 80, New Zealand cricketer.
Vojin Dimitrijević, 80, Serbian human rights activist.
John Evans, 80, American artist.
James W. Holley, III, 85, American politician, Mayor of Portsmouth, Virginia (1984–1987, 1996–2010), complications of a stroke.
Edvard Mirzoyan, 91, Georgian-born Armenian composer.
Claude Pinoteau, 87, French film director (La Boum), cancer.

6
Chadli Bendjedid, 83, Algerian politician, President of Algeria (1979–1992), cancer.
Antonio Cisneros, 69, Peruvian poet, lung cancer.
Anthony John Cooke, 80, English organist.
Nick Curran, 35, American musician, oral cancer.
Irene DeLaby, 90, American baseball player.
Jeanne Delay, 92, French table tennis player.
Rasbihari Desai, 77, Indian composer.
Dal Dozzi, 75, Australian football player.
Préfète Duffaut, 89, Haitian painter.
J. Rufus Fears, 67, American historian, scholar, educator, and author.
Ulrich Franzen, 91, German-born American architect.
Gérard Gropaiz, 69, French Olympic (1960, 1964) swimmer.
Raoul De Keyser, 82, Belgian painter.
Barry Laight, 92, British aerospace engineer.
Albert, Margrave of Meissen, 77, German noble, disputed head of the Royal House of Saxony.
Joseph Meyer, 71, American politician, Wyoming State Treasurer (since 2007), Secretary of State of Wyoming (1999–2007).
R. Nagarathnamma, 86, Indian theatre artiste.
B. Satya Narayan Reddy, 86, Indian politician, Governor of Uttar Pradesh (1990–1993) and Orissa (1993–1995), lung disease.
J. J. C. Smart, 92, British-born Australian philosopher.

7
Mersad Berber, 72, Bosnian painter.
Larry Block, 69, American actor (Slap Shot, Cocktail, Don't Say a Word).
Andrew Brimmer, 86, American economist, Federal Reserve Board of Governors (1966–1974).
Georges Casolari, 71, French footballer (AS Monaco).
John Cleary, 80, Canadian politician, member of the Legislative Assembly of Ontario (1987–2003).
Roman Danylak, 81, Canadian Ukrainian Catholic hierarch, Apostolic Administrator of Toronto and Eastern Canada (1992–1998).
Anant Dave, 74, Indian politician, cancer.
Mervyn Dymally, 86, Trinidadian-born American politician, Lieutenant Governor of California (1975–1979), member of the House of Representatives (1981–1993).
Clive Emmanuel, 64–65, British academic.
Heriberto Lazcano Lazcano, 37, Mexican drug lord (Los Zetas), shooting.
Ivo Michiels, 89, Belgian writer.
Hank Moonjean, 82, American film producer (Dangerous Liaisons, Child's Play, The Great Gatsby),  pancreatic cancer.
Wiley Reed, 68, American-born Australian blues musician, complications from a fall.
André Saint-Mleux, 92, Monegasque politician, Minister of State (1972–1981).

8
Varsha Bhosle, 56, Indian journalist and singer, suicide by gunshot.
Donnie Butcher, 76, American basketball player and coach (New York Knicks, Detroit Pistons).
Walter Carsen, 100, German-born Canadian businessman and philanthropist.
Bidit Lal Das, 74, Bangladeshi folk singer.
Marilou Diaz-Abaya, 57, Filipina film director, breast cancer.
Bill Drake, 81, British rugby league player.
Leopoldo García-Colín, 81, Mexican physicist.
James Kinsella, 88, American politician, Mayor of Hartford, Connecticut (1957–1960).
Rafael Lesmes, 85, Spanish footballer.
Eric Lomax, 93, Scottish author.
José Merino del Río, 63, Costa Rican politician, kidney cancer.
Ken Sansom, 85, American voice actor (Winnie the Pooh, Transformers, The Chipmunk Adventure), stroke.
Hans Kristian Seip, 92, Norwegian forester.
Nawal Kishore Sharma, 87, Indian politician, Governor of Gujarat (2004–2009).
John Tchicai, 76, Danish jazz saxophonist and composer, brain hemorrhage.
Eduard Volodarsky, 71, Russian scriptwriter (At Home Among Strangers, My Friend Ivan Lapshin).

9
Luna Alcalay, 83, Austrian pianist, music educator and composer. 
Ken Bartholomew, 92, American Olympic silver medal-winning (1948) speed skater.
Paddy Roy Bates, 91, British pirate radio broadcaster, founder of the Principality of Sealand, Alzheimer's disease.
Mark Brovun, 66, Ukrainian art director.
Federico A. Cordero, 84, Puerto Rican classical guitarist.
Bill Gardiner, 83, Australian rugby player.
Marina Golub, 54, Russian actress, traffic collision.
Eddie Harvey, 86, British jazz musician.
Sammi Kane Kraft, 20, American child actress (Bad News Bears), traffic collision.
Stefan Leletko, Polish Olympic weightlifter
Budd Lynch, 95, Canadian-born American public address announcer (Detroit Red Wings).
George Paciullo, 78, Australian politician.
Kenny Rollins, 89, American Olympic gold medal-winning (1948) basketball player.
Elo Romančík, 89, Slovak actor, cardiac failure.
Harris Savides, 55, American cinematographer (Zodiac, Milk, American Gangster), brain cancer.

10
Ilse Maria Aschner, 94, Austrian journalist.
Ram Narayan Bishnoi, 80, Indian politician.
Mamia Chentouf, 89–90, Algerian midwife and independence activist.
Deborah Chessler, 88–89, American songwriter.
Kevin Curran, 53, Zimbabwean cricketer, suspected heart attack.
Enrico di Robilant, 87–88, Italian philosopher.
Sam Gibbons, 92, American politician, member of the U.S. House of Representatives from Florida (1963–1997).
Andrey Gonchar, 80, Soviet and Russian mathematician.
Jos Huysmans, 70, Belgian racing cyclist, heart attack.
Alex Karras, 77, American football player (Detroit Lions) and actor (Blazing Saddles, Webster), kidney failure.
Piotr Lenartowicz, 78, Polish Jesuit and philosopher.
Robert Litz, 62, American playwright, natural causes.
Jonas Mačys, 74, Lithuanian politician.
Carla Porta Musa, 110, Italian essayist, poet, and supercentenarian, pneumonia.
Leo O'Brien, 41, American actor (The Last Dragon).
Basil L. Plumley, 92, American Army command sergeant major, cancer.
Mark Poster, 71, American philosopher.
Peter Ross-Edwards, 90, Australian politician, leader of the Victorian Country Party (1970–1988).
Malcolm Sampson, 72, English rugby league player.
Mike Singleton, 61, British video game developer, cancer.
Amanda Todd, 15, Canadian high school student and cyberbullying victim, suicide by hanging.
Kyaw Zaw, 92, Burmese military officer and politician.

11
Avraham Abutbul, 51, Israeli actor, singer and musician (Ushpizin), brain tumor.
Balu Alaganan, 87, Indian cricketer.
Frank Alamo, 70, French singer, amyotrophic lateral sclerosis.
Johannes Bastiaan, 101, German violinist.
Seamus Bonner, 63, Irish Gaelic footballer (Donegal), short illness.
Pier Ugo Calzolari, 74, Italian academic, Rector of University of Bologna (2000–2009).
Beano Cook, 81, American college football historian and television sports analyst (ESPN).
Patrick Dignan, 92, Irish-born British Army surgeon.
Bill Ezinicki, 88, Canadian ice hockey player (Toronto Maple Leafs, Boston Bruins).
Charles E. Fritch, 85, American writer and editor.
Avrohom Genachowsky, 76, Israeli rabbi, pancreatic cancer.
Helmut Haller, 73, German footballer, Parkinson's disease and dementia.
Robert Hughes, 81, American Olympic water polo player and swimmer.
Edward Kossoy, 99, Polish lawyer, publicist and activist for victims of Nazism.
Ernst Lindner, 77, German international footballer.
Clarence M. Mitchell, III, 72, American politician, Maryland Senate (1967–1986) and House member (1963–1967), cancer.
Édgar Negret, 92, Colombian sculptor, cancer and heart failure.
Sher Afgan Niazi, 66, Pakistani politician, liver cancer.
Champ Summers, 66, American baseball player (Cincinnati Reds, Detroit Tigers), kidney cancer.

12
Bob Aynsley, 90, New Zealand rugby league player.
Britton Chance, Jr., 72, American yacht designer, complications of a stroke.
John Call Cook, 94, American geophysicist.
James Coyne, 102, Canadian banker, Governor of the Bank of Canada (1955–1961).
Raphael E. Freundlich, 84, Israeli classical scholar.
William C. Friday, 92, American educator, President of the University of North Carolina (1956–1986).
John Garcia, 95, American psychologist.
Ray Gietzelt, 90, Australian trade union leader. 
Norm Grabowski, 79, American actor (The Towering Inferno) and hot rod builder.
Jean-Pierre Hautier, 56, Belgian television presenter and broadcaster, cancer.
Sukhdev Singh Kang, 81, Indian jurist and politician, Chief Justice of the Jammu and Kashmir High Court (1989–1993), Governor of Kerala (1997–2002).
Ervin Kassai, 87, Hungarian Olympic and international basketball referee.
Jim Kremmel, 63, American baseball player (Chicago Cubs).
Torkom Manoogian, 93, Iraqi-born Armenian Apostolic  hierarch, Patriarch of Jerusalem (since 1990).
Erik Moseholm, 82, Danish jazz musician.
Henry Moyo, 65, Malawian football coach (national team, 1984).
Geraldine Mucha, 95, Scottish composer.
Steve Newman, 58, American football player and coach, heart attack.
Jorun Askersrud Nygaard, 83, Norwegian cross country skier.
Tony Pawson, 91, English cricketer and writer (Kent).
Břetislav Pojar, 89, Czech animator and film director.
Varinder Singh, 57, Indian Army officer, awarded Vir Chakra.
Vera Smith, 80, Canadian skater.
David Trosch, 76, American Roman Catholic priest, advocate of justifiable homicide for murderers of abortion providers, after long illness.
Harry Valérien, 88, German sports journalist.

13
Marc Awodey, 51, American artist and poet.
Sir Stuart Bell, 74, British politician, MP for Middlesbrough (since 1983), pancreatic cancer.
Paul Brown, 43, American race car driver (Pirelli World Challenge), melanoma.
George D. Buffett, 83, American politician.
Georges Chaulet, 81, French writer.
Gary Collins, 74, American actor (The Sixth Sense, The Wackiest Ship in the Army) and television host (Miss America), natural causes.
Carl-Wilhelm Engdahl, 86, Swedish fencer.
Tomonobu Imamichi, 89, Japanese philosopher.
Saiichi Maruya, 87, Japanese author and literary critic, heart failure.
Joey Pal, 85, Canadian football player (Montreal Alouettes).
Jim Rollo, 75, Scottish footballer, cancer.
Hisham Al-Saedni, 47, Palestinian militant, air strike.
Frank Sando, 81, British Olympic cross-country runner.
Harihar Swain, 73, Indian politician, MP for Aska (2004–2009), cancer.
Szeto Kam-Yuen, 48, Hong Kong screenwriter, lung cancer.
* Manuel Torres Félix, 58, Mexican drug trafficker for the Sinaloa Cartel, shot.

14
Billy Benn Perrurle, 68–69, Alyawarre landscape artist.
Kyle Bennett, 33, American BMX cyclist, traffic collision.
Kees W. Bolle, 84, Dutch historian.
S. Ward Casscells, 60, American cardiologist, Assistant Secretary of Defense for Health Affairs (2007–2009), prostate cancer.
John Clive, 79, English actor (A Clockwork Orange, The Italian Job, Yellow Submarine).
Branko Črnac Tusta, 57, Croatian singer, throat cancer.
Max Fatchen, 92, Australian journalist and children's writer.
James R. Grover, Jr., 93, American politician, member of the U.S. House of Representatives from New York (1963–1975), heart failure.
Sir John Moreton, 94, British diplomat.
Buster Pearson, 71, Jamaican musician, father and manager of Five Star. 
Joseph Rosenmiller, 87, American businessman and philanthropist.
Eddie Russo, 86, American race car driver.
*Odorico Leovigildo Sáiz Pérez, 100, Spanish-born Peruvian Roman Catholic prelate, Vicar Apostolic of Requena (1973–1987).
Larry Sloan, 89, American publisher (Mad Libs), co-founder of Price Stern Sloan, after brief illness.
Arlen Specter, 82, American politician, U.S. Senator from Pennsylvania (1981–2011), complications of non-Hodgkin lymphoma.
Marc Swayze, 99, American comic book artist (Captain Marvel).
Elizabeth Watkins, 89, English author, short illness.
Dody Weston Thompson, 89, American photographer.
Gart Westerhout, 85, Dutch-born American astronomer.

15
Margaret Alington, 92, New Zealand historian.
Michael Asher, 69, American conceptual artist.
Abba Bina, Papua New Guinean businessman. (death announced on this date)
Axel Borup-Jørgensen, 87, Danish composer.
Claude Cheysson, 92, French politician, Minister of Foreign Affairs (1981–1984).
Vladimir Čonč, 84, Croatian footballer.
Patrick R. Cooney, 78, American Roman Catholic prelate, Bishop of Gaylord (1989–2009).
Joseph W. Eaton, 93, German-born American sociologist.
Robert T. Francoeur, 80, American biologist and sexologist.
Erol Günaydın, 79, Turkish actor, heart failure.
Trevor Kemp, Scottish footballer (Berwick Rangers).
María Rosa Menocal, 59, Cuban-born American academic, melanoma.
* Norodom Sihanouk, 89, Cambodian royal, King (1941–1955, 1993–2004) and nine-term Prime Minister, heart attack.
Susan Parkinson, 87, British potter and charity worker.
Maria Petrou, 59, Greek-born British computer scientist, cancer.
Alberto Reif, 66, Italian footballer.
Pat Ward, 55, American politician, Iowa State Senator (since 2004), breast cancer.
Sam Williams, 88, American basketball coach (Texan Pan American).

16
Bernard Chaet, 88, American artist.
James D. Conte, 53, American politician, member of the New York State Assembly (since 1988), cancer.
Frank Moore Cross, 91, American biblical scholar.
John A. Durkin, 76, American politician, Senator for New Hampshire (1975–1980).
Mario Gallegos, Jr., 62, American politician, Texas State Senator (since 1995), complications of liver disease.
Al Ghesquiere, 93, American football player.
Nathan Glick, 100, American artist and illustrator.
Wava Banes Turner Henry, 92, American teacher, founded Tau Beta Sigma.
Aleksandr Koshkin, 53, Russian Soviet-era Olympic silver medal-winning (1980) boxer, stroke.
Ethel Person, 77, American psychiatrist and psychoanalyst.
Bódog Török, 88, Hungarian handball player, coach and sports official, complications of surgery.
Eddie Yost, 86, American baseball player and coach (Washington Senators), cardiovascular disease.

17
Milija Aleksic, 61, English football player (Tottenham Hotspur).
Émile Allais, 100, French Olympic bronze medal-winning (1936) alpine ski racer.
Milt Drewer, 89, American football coach.
René-Marie Ehuzu, 68, Beninese Roman Catholic prelate, Bishop of Abomey (2002–2007) and Porto Novo (since 2007).
Henry Friedlander, 82, German-born American historian of the Holocaust.
Bandya Kakade, 67, Indian footballer, heart attack.
Sylvia Kristel, 60, Dutch actress (Emmanuelle), model, and singer, throat and liver cancer.
Harry E. Luther, 60, American botanist.
Bertie Marshall, 76, Trinidadian musician and steelpan maker.
Stanford R. Ovshinsky, 89, American inventor and scientist, prostate cancer.
Pépito Pavon, 71, Spanish footballer (Olympique de Marseille).
Presvis, 8, British Thoroughbred racehorse, euthanised.
Karin Stoltenberg, 80, Norwegian geneticist and politician.
Kōji Wakamatsu, 76, Japanese film director, traffic collision.

18
Florence Akins, 106, New Zealand artist.
Christopher Allen, 68, English cricket player (Dorset), bowel cancer.  
Borah Bergman, 85, American free jazz pianist, dementia.
Brain Damage, 34, American professional wrestler, suicide.
E. K. Fretwell, 88, American teacher and university administrator.
Zdzislaw Kotla, 63, Polish Olympic sailor.
Mihály Lukács, 57, Hungarian Romani politician, member of the National Assembly (2002–2006), after long illness.
Bob Martin, 87, American Olympic rower.
Slater Martin, 86, American Hall of Fame basketball player (Minneapolis Lakers, St. Louis Hawks).
George Mattos, 83, American Olympic (1952, 1956) pole vaulter, prostate cancer.
Jack McGaw, 76, Canadian broadcaster.
John Rigby, 89, Australian artist.
Dilbagh Singh Kler, 76, Malaysian Olympic athlete.
Otto Richard Skopil, Jr., 93, American federal judge (9th Circuit Court of Appeals).
Albert Lee Ueltschi, 95, American aviation trainer, founder of FlightSafety International.
David S. Ware, 62, American jazz saxophonist, complications of a kidney transplant.

19
Wissam al-Hassan, 47, Lebanese police officer, head of the Information Branch of the Internal Security Forces, car bomb.
Wiyogo Atmodarminto, 89, Indonesian general, Governor of Jakarta (1987–1992).
Lincoln Alexander, 90, Canadian politician, MP for Hamilton West (1968–1980), Minister of Labour (1979–1980), and Lieutenant Governor of Ontario (1985–1991).
Copiad, 23, Swedish breeding stallion and racing trotter.
Joe Cullinane, 89, American baseball broadcaster and author.
Raymond Dumais, 62, Canadian Roman Catholic ex-prelate, Bishop of Gaspé (1993–2001).
Mike Graham, 61, American professional wrestler, suicide by gunshot.
Walter Harrison, 91, British politician, MP for Wakefield (1964–1987), Government Deputy Chief Whip (1974–1979).
Jack Hirst, 75, British rugby league player.
Dessie Kane, 60, Irish cricketer.
Johann Kniewasser, 61, Austrian  alpine skier, liver disease.
Thomas Madigage, 41, South African footballer and coach, traffic collision.
Fiorenzo Magni, 91, Italian racing cyclist, Giro d'Italia winner (1948, 1951, 1955), aneurysm.
Manuel António Pina, 68, Portuguese journalist and writer.
John Radford, 65, British writer, heart failure.
Barbara Sowers, 80, American baseball player.
Raúl Valencia, 36, Spanish footballer, following a long illness.

20
Oli Ahad, 84 or 85, Bangladeshi politician and language activist, lung infection.
Jaouad Akaddar, 28, Moroccan footballer, cardiac arrest.
George Dessart, 87, American television producer and executive.
Milena Doleželová-Velingerová, 80, Czech sinologist.
Przemysław Gintrowski, 60, Polish composer and musician.
William Goad, 68, British businessman and convicted child sex offender, natural causes.
Paul Kurtz, 86, American skeptic and secular humanist.
Daniel Enele Kwanairara, 65, Solomon Islands politician, MP for North Malaita (1997–2001, 2004–2010), Minister for Agriculture and Livestock (2005–2006).
Dave May, 68, American baseball player (Atlanta Braves, Milwaukee Brewers, Baltimore Orioles), complications from cancer and diabetes.
Sándor Mazány, 89, Hungarian Olympic skier.
John McConnell, 97, American peace activist, designed the Earth Day flag.
Joe Melia, 77, British actor. 
Mataiasi Ragigia, Fijian politician, MP for Suva City Urban (since 2001) and minister.
Daphne Skillern, 84, British police officer.
Kirdy Stevens, 92, American pornographic film director.
E. Donnall Thomas, 92, American physician, Nobel laureate in Physiology or Medicine (1990), heart disease.
Raymond Watson, 86, American business executive (Walt Disney Productions), complications of Parkinson's disease.

21
Raja Ali, 36, Indian cricketer, cardiac arrest.
Harvie Andre, 72, Canadian politician, MP for Calgary Centre (1972–1993) and cabinet minister, cancer.
Jan Barnard, 83, South African Olympic (1956) marathon runner.
Elizabeth Bell, 71, English actress, oesophageal cancer.
*Chacha Pakistani, 90, Pakistani nationalist.
Geoff Beynon, 86, British trade union leader.
Yash Chopra, 80, Indian director, filmmaker, script writer, and producer (Kabhi Kabhie, Deewaar, Veer-Zaara), dengue fever and multiple organ failure.
J. Duncan M. Derrett, 90, British academic.
Antoni Dobrowolski, 108, Polish Holocaust survivor, oldest known Auschwitz survivor.
Hans Fichtner, 95, German rocket scientist.
Tim Johnson, 52, American country music songwriter, cancer.
Ted Kazanoff, 90, American actor (Law & Order).
Alf Kumalo, 82, South African photographer, suspected kidney failure.
Jaroslav Kozlík, 105, Czech pedagogue and volleyball player, natural causes.
George McGovern, 90, American politician and USAAF pilot, U.S. Representative (1957–1961) and Senator (1963–1981), 1972 Democratic Party presidential nominee.
Steve Paul, 71, American nightclub owner (The Scene) and artist manager (Johnny Winter).
Irene Treppler, 86, American politician, member of the Missouri House of Representatives (1973–1985) and Missouri Senate (1985–1997), dementia.
William Walker, 99, British fighter pilot (Battle of Britain), stroke.
Run Wrake, 46, British animator and film director, cancer.

22
Nayden Apostolov, 64, Bulgarian geographer, theorist, writer and professor.
*Bidushi Dash Barde, 23, Indian actress and model, bleeding from lacerations. (body discovered on this date)
Betty Binns Fletcher, 89, American federal judge (9th Circuit Court of Appeals).
Amrita Chaudhry, 40, Indian journalist, road accident.
Carolyn Conwell, 82, American actress (Torn Curtain, The Young and the Restless). 
Leroy Coury, Kittitian cricketer.
Claire Dan, 92, Australian philanthropist, Founder and Life President of the Sydney International Piano Competition.
Don W. East, 67, American politician.
Ahmad Ghabel, 58, Iranian religious scholar and political dissident, brain tumor.
Arthur Jensen, 89, American psychologist, educator and author, Parkinson's disease.
Jack Lumsden, 85, British Olympic modern pentathlete.
Russell Means, 72, American Ogala Lakota activist and actor (Pocahontas, The Last of the Mohicans, Pathfinder), esophageal cancer.
Chuckie Merlino, 73, American mobster (Philadelphia crime family).
Mike Morris, 66, British television presenter (TV-am), heart failure.
Shubha Phutela, 21, Indian film actress and model, multiple organ failure.
Gabrielle Roth, 71, American dancer and musician, lung cancer.
Donald Takayama, 68, American surfer, member of the International Surfing Hall of Fame (1991), complications from heart surgery.
Sir Wilson Whineray, 77, New Zealand rugby union player and businessman (Carter Holt Harvey).

23
Barouh Berkovits, 86, Czech-born American bioengineer.
William Joel Blass, 95, American judge and politician, member of the Mississippi House of Representatives (1953–1960).
Wilhelm Brasse, 94, Polish photographer, prisoner in Auschwitz during World War II.
Roland de la Poype, 92, French fighter pilot.
Philippe Di Santo, 62, Belgian footballer (R. Charleroi S.C., Sint-Truiden, Delfino Pescara 1936) and coach (K.A.S. Eupen), following a long illness.
Sunil Gangopadhyay, 78, Indian writer and poet, cardiac arrest.
Hughie Hay, 80, Scottish footballer.
Jozef Mannaerts, 89, Belgian footballer (K.R.C. Mechelen).
Michael Marra, 60, Scottish musician and songwriter, throat cancer.

24
Peggy Ahern, 95, American child actress (Our Gang).
Hannie Bal, 91, Dutch painter.
Janet Berliner, 73, South African-born American science fiction author.
Anita Björk, 89, Swedish actress.
Jeff Blatnick, 55, American Olympic gold medal-winning (1984) wrestler and sports commentator, complications following heart surgery.
Phil Bygrave, 83, New Zealand field hockey player.
Juanita Casey, 87, Irish novelist and poet.
Bill Dees, 73, American musician and songwriter ("Oh, Pretty Woman", "It's Over"), brain tumor.
Rostyslav Dotsenko, 81, Ukrainian translator, literary critic, and author.
* Margaret Osborne duPont, 94, American tennis player, winner of 37 Grand Slam titles.
Yevseviy Politylo, 84, Ukrainian Orthodox hierarch, Metropolitan of Rivne and Ostroh (2005–2012).
Alfred Schakron, 51, Lebanese-born Belizean businessman, shot.
Hans-Hermann Sturm, 85, German army officer, awarded Knight's Cross of the Iron Cross (1944).
Peter Wright, 78, English footballer (Colchester United F.C.).

25
Michael Daniel Ambatchew, 45, Ethiopian children's book writer.
Rafiqul Anwar, 59, Bangladeshi politician, liver ailment.
Aude, 65, Canadian writer, leukemia.
Jacques Barzun, 104, French-born American historian.
Dimitris Beis, 84, Greek politician, Mayor of Athens (1979–1986), cancer.
Jaspal Bhatti, 57, Indian actor (Flop Show) and comedian, traffic collision.
Max Brown, Australian politician.
Cesare Canevari, 85,  Italian actor, director and screenwriter (Matalo!, A Man for Emmanuelle).
John Cannon, 86, English historian.
Hadley Castille, 79, American Cajun fiddler.
John Connelly, 74, English footballer (Burnley F.C.), cancer.
Piermassimiliano Dotto, 42, Italian rugby union player, heart attack.
Roger Gibbs, 80, New Zealand swimmer.
Jacques Goimard, 78, French writer, Parkinson's disease.
Aung Gyi, 93, Burmese politician, cardiac arrest.
Balázs Győrffy, 74, Hungarian-born American physicist.
Olga Jančić, 83, Serbian sculptor.
Alexander Lapin, 67, Russian photographer.
James Gibson Lorimer, 89, Canadian politician, member of the Legislative Assembly of British Columbia for Burnaby-Willingdon (1960–1975; 1979–1983).
Erich Masurat, 85, German Olympic sports shooter.
Les Mueller, 93, American baseball player (Detroit Tigers).
Emanuel Steward, 68, American Hall of Fame boxing trainer and HBO boxing commentator, complications of diverticulitis.
Joop Stokkermans, 75, Dutch composer.
Ronald John Yates, Australian businessman, CEO of Qantas.

26
Mac Ahlberg, 81, Swedish cinematographer (Beverly Hills Cop III, The Brady Bunch Movie, Oscar), heart failure.
Carlos Azevedo, 63, Portuguese composer and pianist.
Richard N. Current, 100, American historian and biographer.
Luigi Dadda, 89, Italian computer scientist (Dadda multiplier).
Arnold Greenberg, 80, American businessman, co-founder of Snapple, cancer.
*Eloy Gutiérrez Menoyo, 77, Spanish-born Cuban dissident (Alpha 66), heart attack.
Joža Horvat, 97, Croatian writer.
John M. Johansen, 96, American architect, last surviving member of the Harvard Five, heart failure.
Alan Kirschenbaum, 51, American television writer and producer (Coach, My Name Is Earl, Raising Hope), suicide.
Naoki Miyamoto, 77, Japanese professional Go player, hepatocellular carcinoma.
Natina Reed, 32, American musician (Blaque) and actress (Bring It On), traffic collision.
Björn Sieber, 23, Austrian alpine skier, traffic collision.
Alan Stretton, 90, Australian major general, disaster recovery leader (Cyclone Tracy) and AFL player (St. Kilda), haemorrhage.
Georges Van Straelen, 55, French footballer (FC Nantes, Girondins de Bordeaux, Toulouse FC, RC Strasbourg) and coach, lung cancer.
Frank Weddig, 67, American politician, Colorado Senate (1994–2000) and House of Representatives (2000–2004).

27
Anatoly Betekhtin, 81, Russian military commander.
Ian Buist, 82, British diplomat.
Terry Callier, 67, American singer-songwriter, cancer.
Robert W. Castle, 83, American Episcopal priest and actor (Philadelphia), natural causes.
Angelo Maria Cicolani, 60, Italian politician, Senator for Rieti (since 2001).
Joe Cinderella, 85, American guitarist and educator, natural causes.
Dick de Fegely, 84, Australian politician, member of the Victorian Legislative Council (1985–1999).
Regina Dourado, 59, Brazilian actress, breast cancer.
Jacques Dupin, 85, French poet and critic.
Dmitry Gayev, 61, Russian civil servant, head of Moscow Metro, cancer.
Illar Hallaste, 53, Estonian cleric, politician, lawyer, and businessman.
Hans Werner Henze, 86, German composer (Symphony No. 9, Elegy for Young Lovers, The Raft of the Medusa).
*Eduardo Herrera Riera, 85, Venezuelan Roman Catholic prelate, Bishop of Carora (1994–2003), cancer.
John LoVetere, 76, American football player (Los Angeles Rams, New York Giants).
Felix Eugenio Mkhori, 81, Malawian Roman Catholic prelate, Bishop of Chikwawa (1979–2001) and Lilongwe (2001–2007).
Terry Owens, 68, American football player (San Diego Chargers), Chronic traumatic encephalopathy (CTE).
Rodney S. Quinn, 89, American politician, member of the Maine House of Representatives (1974–1978), Secretary of State of Maine (1979–1988), pneumonia.
Alan Shaxon, 78, British magician.
Göran Stangertz, 68, Swedish actor and director, throat cancer.
Ray Torres, 54, Mexican baseball player.
Bill White, 51, American animator, after brief illness.

28
Vitaliy Alisevich, 45, Belarusian hammer thrower, heart problem.
Robert Amft, 95, American painter, sculptor, photographer, and designer.
Merry Anders, 78, American actress (Maverick, Bonanza). 
François Arnal, 88, French painter and sculptor.
Bertil Bäckvall, 89, Swedish footballer and football manager.
Gordon Bilney, 73, Australian politician, member of the House of Representatives for Kingston (1983–1996).
Bob Brunner, 78, American television writer and producer (Diff'rent Strokes, Happy Days, The Odd Couple), heart attack.
John Cheffers, 76, Australian sports administrator and footballer.
Nicki R. Crick, 54, American psychologist.
Jack Dellal, 89, British property investor, natural causes.
Ernst Heinrich Karlen, 90, Swiss-born Zimbabwean Roman Catholic prelate, Archbishop of Bulawayo (1974–1997).
Susan Murphy-Milano, 52, American author, cancer.
George Riashi, 78, Lebanese Melkite Catholic hierarch, Archbishop of Tripoli (1995–2010).
Mel Spence, 76, Jamaican Olympic sprinter. 
Tie the Knot, 18, Australian Thoroughbred racehorse, winner of the Sydney Cup (1998, 1999) and Chipping Norton Stakes (1999, 2000, 2001, 2002). (death announced on this date)
Gaetano Tumiati, 94, Italian novelist and journalist, won 1976 Premio Campiello.

29
Brenda Agard, 51, British photographer, poet and storyteller.
Warsame Shire Awale, 61, Somali poet and writer, shooting.
Letitia Baldrige, 86, American etiquette expert, White House Social Secretary, osteoarthritis with cardiac complications.
J. Bernlef, 75, Dutch writer.
George Bossy, 85, Canadian Olympic sprint canoer and football player.
Valerie Todd Davies, 92, Australian zoologist.
Thomas Delworth, 83, Canadian diplomat and academic.
Cordelia Edvardson, 83, Swedish journalist and Holocaust survivor.
John Hind Farmer, 95, British soldier.
Albano Harguindeguy, 85, Argentine general.
Susumu Ishikawa, 79, Japanese voice actor and singer, stomach cancer and emphysema.
Kenneth G. Ryder, 88, American academic, President of Northeastern University (1975–1989).
Wallace L. W. Sargent, 77, British-born American astronomer, prostate cancer.
Jack Vaughn, 92, American public servant and diplomat, Director of the Peace Corps (1966–1969), cancer.

30
Arjen Arî, 55–56, Kurdish poet and writer.
Franck Biancheri, 51, French politician, cancer.
Jan Crutchfield, 74, American singer and songwriter.
Minardi, 14, American-bred, Irish-trained Thoroughbred racehorse and sire.
Samina Raja, 51, Pakistani poet, writer, educationist, and broadcaster, cancer.
Leonard Termo, 77, American actor (Fight Club, Johnny Dangerously).
Dan Tieman, 71, American basketball player (Cincinnati Royals), cancer.
Wayland Tunley, 75, British architect. 
Trevor West, 74, Irish academic and politician, Senator for Dublin University (1970–1981, 1982–1983).
Lebbeus Woods, 72, American architect and artist.

31
Gae Aulenti, 84, Italian architect and designer.
Hugh Bell, 85, American photographer.
Frederick C. Blesse, 91, American general.
June Blundell, Lady Blundell, 90, New Zealand charity patron, widow of former governor-general Sir Denis Blundell.
Nona Byrne, 90, British Building Society founder and philanthropist.
Brian Cobby, 83, British actor, voice of the speaking clock (1985–2007).
Alfons Demming, 84, German Roman Catholic prelate, Auxiliary Bishop of Münster (1976–1998). 
Jack Finck, 82, Australian football player (Collingwood).
John Fitch, 95, American racing driver, Merkel cell carcinoma.
Alexander Kibrik, 73, Russian linguist (Moscow State University), after long illness.
Fernando Ortíz, 89, Mexican Olympic sailor.
Christina Persighetti, 76, British Olympic athlete.
John H. Reed, 91, American politician, Governor of Maine (1959–1966), pneumonia.
*Faustino Sainz Muñoz, 75, Spanish Roman Catholic prelate, Apostolic Nuncio to Great Britain (2004–2010), cancer.
Teri Shields, 79, American model and actress, mother and manager of actress Brooke Shields, illness related to dementia.
Bernard John Smith, 61, British geologist.
Fergie Sutherland, 81, British–born Irish horse trainer.
Bill Tom, 89, American Olympic gymnast.
Konstantin Vyrupayev, 82, Russian Olympic medal-winning (1956, 1960) wrestler.

References

2012-10
 10

Fr fr say mums